Clivina jodasi is a species of ground beetle in the subfamily Scaritinae. It was described by Kult in 1959.

References

jodasi
Beetles described in 1959